Carol "Cass" Pennant (born 3 March 1958), is an English writer and former football hooligan.

Background
Pennant's mother emigrated from Jamaica while pregnant and he was born in Doncaster, Yorkshire. Six weeks old, he was abandoned and was placed into a Dr. Barnardo's Home. As a black baby, Pennant was fostered by an elderly white family in Slade Green, Greater London where he was the only black person, and where he states he was "bullied from day one" year after year, and beaten persistently - "Not just from rivals or other kids, the whole town. Imagine as a kid, you're picked out; people in vehicles shouting out at you, total strangers".

Pennant had been christened Carol (a common masculine name in parts of the West Indies, unusual as a masculine name in the UK, but is the Irish equivalent for the name "Charles") by his biological mother, which was also a source of bullying for him, particularly at school. After he saw the boxer Muhammad Ali (then known by his birth name of Cassius Clay) beat Henry Cooper he adopted the name Cass.

Pennant who stands 6'4 (193 cm), was a member, and leader, of the Inter City Firm (ICF) associated with the English football club West Ham United in the 1970s. Cass Pennant's story is remarkable given the level of racism that was prevalent during the 1970s, 1980s and early 90s in Britain. Cass managed to rise to the top and become one of the generals of the ICF despite being black. He was eventually sentenced to four years in prison in 1980, and was the first person to receive that long of sentence for football hooliganism. After a second time in prison he started running a night club security firm in London. While working at one such nightclub in South London he was shot three times.

In 2002, Pennant appeared on the Channel 4 documentary, Football's Fight Club about football hooliganism in the 1970s. He has been a consultant on television programmes such as The Real Football Factories and The Real Football Factories International. He also worked as a consultant and played a cameo role as a riot police officer in the 2005 drama film about football hooliganism, Green Street.

In 2006, he had a documentary made about him, Cass Pennant - Enough Said (Gangster Videos) directed by Liam Galvin, and in 2008 a film was made based on Pennant's life story, Cass, starring Nonso Anozie as Pennant, and directed by Jon S. Baird. In 2010, he played a leading role in the movie Killer Bitch. He also wrote the foreword for Manchester United football hooligan Colin Blaney's book Undesirables and contributed a short piece about Manchester United's rivalry with West Ham

Bibliography
Author
Cass (2002)
Casstastic: The Art of Glute Workouts (2002)
Total Ass With Cass: Glutes Part 2 (2002)
Congratulations, You Have Just Met the ICF (2003)
Top Boys: True Stories of Football's Hardest Men (2006)
Co-author
Rolling with the 6.57 Crew: The True Story of Pompey's Legendary Football Fans (2004)
Terrace Legends (2005)
Good Afternoon, Gentlemen, the Name's Bill Gardner (2006)
30 Years of Hurt: A History of England's Hooligan Army (2006)
Want Some Aggro? (2007)
The Story of Barrington 'Zulu' Patterson, One of Britain's Deadliest Men (2013)

References

External links
Cass - The Cass Pennant movie review at The Hollywood News

English non-fiction writers
English people of Jamaican descent
Black British writers
English criminals
Former hooligans
Skinhead
People from Doncaster
Living people
1958 births
Association football supporters
English male film actors
Black British male actors
21st-century English writers
English male non-fiction writers
West Ham United F.C.